The 58th Legislative Assembly of the U.S. state of Oregon convened in January 1975 for its regular session, and for a one-day special session in September 1975. The Senate and House were both controlled by the Democratic Party.

References 

Oregon legislative sessions
1975 in Oregon
1976 in Oregon
1975 U.S. legislative sessions
1976 U.S. legislative sessions